Aditya Birla Payments Bank Limited (ABPB) was a payments bank started as a joint venture by Aditya Birla Nuvo Ltd. and Idea Cellular. Launched on 22 February 2018, it is the fourth payments bank to begin operations since issuance of licenses to 11 firms by the Reserve Bank of India in August 2015. Payments Banks are a special category of banks that can accept deposits of up to 2 lakh but cannot give loans or credit cards.

On 20 July 2019, Aditya Birla Payments Bank announced that it would be shutting down operations subject to the receipt of requisite regulatory consents and approval.

History
Aditya Birla Nuvo (now Grasim Industries Limited) was one of the 11 entities to receive an in-principle approval by Reserve Bank of India (RBI) to set-up payments banks in India, in August 2015. Post the in-principle approval, RBI had issued a license to Aditya Birla Payments Bank under Section 22 (1) of the Banking Regulation Act, 1949 to commence with the business of payments bank in April 2017.

Aditya Birla Payments Bank earlier operated as IMCSL (Idea Mobile Commerce Services Ltd) as a brand of Idea Cellular Ltd.

Aditya Birla Nuvo Limited holds 51 percent shares while the remaining 49 percent are with Idea Cellular.

Aditya Birla Payments Bank, which was a joint venture between Aditya Birla Nuvo and Idea Cellular, discontinued its banking business within 2 years of its inceptions due to lack of funds.

References

External links

 

Payments banks
Banks established in 2016
Online payments
Indian brands
Privately held companies of India
Indian companies established in 2016
Banks disestablished in 2019
2019 disestablishments in India
2016 establishments in Maharashtra
Banks based in Mumbai